Alberto Costa may refer to:

 Alberto Costa (British politician) (born 1971), British politician
 Alberto Costa (Portuguese politician) (born 1947), Portuguese politician
 Alberto Zalamea Costa (1929–2011), Colombian diplomat

See also 
 Albert Costa (born 1975), Spanish tennis player
 Albert Costa (racing driver) (born 1990), Spanish racing driver
 Tino Costa (Alberto Costa, born 1985), Argentine footballer
 Rui Costa (cyclist) (Rui Alberto Faria da Costa, born 1986), Portuguese road bicycle racer